Hinduism is a minority religion in Jamaica, followed mainly by the Indo-Jamaicans. According to the 2011 census, Hinduism is followed by 0.07% of the population of Jamaica.

Demographics
According to the 2001 census there are 1453 Hindus in Jamaica, which increased to 1836 in the 2011 census.

Temple
The Sanatan Hindu Temple is the only Hindu temple recognised by the Jamaican Government. It was built in mid 1970s by Pandit Munaeshwar Maragh at 114B Hagley Park Road. Today it stands as a place of worship and all major festivals celebrated.

Contemporary Status
The major problem of Jamaica Hindus is the lack of priests. In 2017, Nathan Pandit who was believed to be the only Hindu priest in Jamaica was murdered under mysterious condition. Presently, there are two Hindu priests in Jamaica, Pt. Ramadar Maragh and the newly ordained Pt. Lochan Nathan-Sharma.

See also
Hinduism in Guyana
Hinduism in Panama
Hinduism in Reunion

References

Religion in Jamaica
Jamaica
Jamaica